Paula Trueman (April 25, 1897 – March 23, 1994) was an American film, stage and television actress.

Life and career
Born in 1897 in New York City, to Joseph and Eva (née Cohn) Trueman, she had two sisters, a twin, Natalie (Mrs. Sternberg) and an elder sister, Hannah (Mrs. Bottstein). They were raised in Manhattan. Paula attended Hunter College before gaining admission to the Neighborhood Playhouse to study dancing. Her stage career began with The Grand Street Follies revues in 1924, and at the end of that year she made her dramatic debut in The Little Clay Cart. She was also in the 1930 revue Sweet and Low, which starred Fannie Brice, George Jessel, and James Barton, and appeared in Kiss and Tell, For Love or Money and Wake Up, Darling in the 1940s and 1950s.

Her film debut was in Crime Without Passion (1934). She later played "Mrs. Fenty" in Paint Your Wagon and "Grandma Sarah" in The Outlaw Josey Wales (both with Clint Eastwood). She appeared in Annie Hall and Zelig (both by Woody Allen), Dirty Dancing, and had an uncredited role in Moonstruck. In 1978, she played Maggie Flannigan in All My Children. She appeared as Aunt Teresa in the Tales from the Darkside episode (2/12 - 1985) "Monsters in My Room" and the dying great grandmother in "The Cutty Black Sow" (1988), series 4 episode 14.

Death
Trueman died of natural causes in New York Hospital in 1994, aged 96. She was predeceased in 1976 by her husband, Harold Sterner, an architect, whom she married in 1936.

Filmography

References

External links
 (gives year of birth as 1897)
 

1897 births
1994 deaths
20th-century American actresses
Actresses from New York City
American people of Jewish descent
American stage actresses
American film actresses
American television actresses
Hunter College alumni
People from Manhattan